The Oboe Concerto No. 1 in B flat major (HWV 301) was composed by George Frideric Handel for oboe, orchestra and basso continuo. It was first published in the fourth volume of Select Harmony by Walsh in 1740. Other catalogues of Handel's music have referred to the work as HG xxi, 85; and HHA iv/12,17.

The concerto is thought to be an early work of Handel's, however the attribution to Handel has been questioned on stylistic grounds 

A typical performance of the work takes almost eight minutes.

Movements
The work consists of four movements:

See also
 Handel's concertos

References

Concertos by George Frideric Handel
Handel 1
1740 compositions
Compositions in B-flat major